The 2001 Target Grand Prix, known informally as the 2001 Grand Prix of Chicago, was a Championship Auto Racing Teams (CART) motor race held on July 29, 2001 at Chicago Motor Speedway in Cicero, Illinois, USA. It was the 12th round of the 2001 CART FedEx Championship Series season. Kenny Bräck won his third race of the season and of his CART career for Team Rahal ahead of Patrick Carpentier and Gil de Ferran.

Bräck's quick pace allowed him to make up ground in the second half of the race and ultimately win the race itself, further distancing himself from second place Hélio Castroneves in the drivers' standings. Carpentier and Forsythe Racing were in the middle of a powerful surge in form, with teammates earning podiums at Cleveland and Toronto and Carpentier taking his first career win just a week earlier at the Michigan 500. de Ferran was also beginning an improvement in form and consistency that would make him a championship contender at the end of the season.

The race saw much clean on-track action and multiple lead changes, something that was not common for open-wheel cars on oval tracks. Only three cars retired from the race, and only one was a result of contact with the barriers.

Qualifying

Race

Notes
– Includes one bonus point for leading the most laps.
– Includes one bonus point for being the fastest qualifier.

Race statistics
Lead changes: 14 among 9 drivers

Standings after the race

Drivers' standings 

Constructors' standings

Manufacturer's Standings

References

Chicago Grand Prix, 2001